The British Hard Court Championships is a defunct Grand Prix tennis and WTA Tour affiliated tennis tournament played from 1968 to 1983 and 1995 to 1999. The inaugural edition of the tournament was held in 1924 in Torquay, moving to the West Hants Tennis Club in Bournemouth, England in 1927 and was held there until 1983. The 1977 and 1979 editions were cancelled due to lack of sponsorship. In 1995 the event was revived at Bournemouth as a women's WTA tournament but was only played there that year. The women's final edition in 1996 was held in Cardiff, Wales. The tournament was played on outdoor clay courts. Bournemouth was one of the world's major tournaments, second only to Wimbledon in England and on the same level as Monte Carlo, Rome and Hamburg. In the pre-war era, it was regarded as the most important event outside the four Grand Slams. Fred Perry is the record holder with five consecutive titles, from 1932 through 1936.

Start of Open Era
The Championships hold the distinction of being the first tennis tournament to be held in the Open Era, taking place in April 1968. It started on 22 April at 1:43 p.m. when John Clifton served and won the first point of the open era. Ken Rosewall won the men's singles title, taking home $2,400, while runner-up Rod Laver received $1,200. Virginia Wade won the women's singles title, defeating Winnie Shaw in the final, but did not take home the winner's prize of $720 as she was still an amateur at the time of the tournament. She subsequently became the first amateur to win a title in the Open Era. Christine Janes and her sister Nell Truman became the first winners of an open tennis event by winning the women's doubles title. The tournament was considered a success and attracted almost 30,000 visitors. The young British player Mark Cox went down in tennis history, when at the championships, he became the first amateur player to beat a professional, when he beat the American Pancho Gonzales in five sets in two and a quarter hours.

Results

Men's singles

Women's singles

Men's doubles

Women's doubles

Records

Men's singles
Most titles:  Fred Perry, 5
Most consecutive titles:  Fred Perry, 5
Most finals:  Bunny Austin, 7
Most consecutive finals:  Fred Perry, 5
Most matches played:  William Knight, 55
Most matches won:  William Knight, 44
Most consecutive match wins:  Fred Perry, 25
Most editions played:  Tony Pickard, 16
Best match winning %: Kho Sin-Kie 100.00% 
Longest final:  John Newcombe v  Bob Hewitt, result: 6–8, 6–3, 5–7, 6–4, 6–4, 55 games, 1969
Shortest final:  Manuel Orantes v  Ángel Giménez, result: 6–2, 6–0, 14 games, 1982
Title with the fewest games lost:  Ken Fletcher, 21, 1966
Oldest champion:  Randolph Lycett, 37y 7m and 26d, 1924
Youngest champion:  Lew Gerrard, 21y 0m and 15d, 1959

Source:The Tennis Base.

See also
 British Covered Court Championships

References

External links
 WTA results archive
 British Pathé film reel – British Hard Court Championship 1934

 
Clay court tennis tournaments
Defunct tennis tournaments in the United Kingdom
Tennis tournaments in Wales
WTA Tour
1924 establishments in the United Kingdom
1996 disestablishments in the United Kingdom
Recurring sporting events established in 1924